Mr & Mrs Sailaja Krishnamurthy  is a 2004 Indian Telugu-language romantic drama film which stars Sivaji, Laila, and Dharmavarapu Subramanyam. This film was directed by director Siva Nageswara Rao. The film was a box office success.

Synopsis
Krishna Murthy is an atheist who travels to Annavaram on the severe insistence of his aunt. Sailaja is an extremely religious girl who wants to go to USA for further studies. She is also traveling to Annavaram to get blessings of Lord Satyanarayana. Krishna Murthy and Sailaja happen to share the same Berth in the train. When they arrive at Annavaram, they are forced to share the same room as husband and wife (Mr. & Mrs Sailaja Krishna Murthy) due to the local room-allotment rules.

Due to certain incident, Sailaja and Krishna Murthy get separated in Annavaram. Each one of them do not know whereabouts of other person. Sailaja and Krishna Murthy realize that they had fallen in love. They start searching for each other in Hyderabad city. The rest of the story is all about how they find each other.

Cast 
 Sivaji as Krishnamurthy
 Laila as Sailaja
 Krishna Bhagavan as Guide Dev Anand
 Dharmavarapu Subramanyam as Bhale Rao from Buchireddypalem
 L. B. Sriram as Bus Driver
 Ramaprabha as Krishnamurthy's aunt
 Tanikella Bharani as Sailaja's uncle
 Duvvasi Mohan as Auto Driver Yadagiri
 Giri Babu as Krishnamurthy's boss
 Kondavalasa Lakshmana Rao
 Raghu Babu
 Rallapalli
 Satyam Rajesh

Soundtrack

Satellite Rights
The satellite rights of this movie was bought by Gemini TV.

References

External links
 
Indiaglitz review

2004 films
2000s Telugu-language films
Films directed by Siva Nageswara Rao